The Diacore Gaborone Marathon is a marathon in Gaborone, Botswana. The marathon is governed by the International Association of Athletics Federations and the Botswana Athletics Association. It is open for to ages 19 and up, and the race is a qualifier for the Comrades Marathon in Durban and Pietermaritzburg, South Africa, and the 2012 Olympic Marathon in London. The marathon is the second of its kind in Botswana, after the Bosele Marathon in Selebi-Phikwe.

History
The marathon was first established as the Gaborone City Marathon in 2009 and was first run on 18 April 2010. The 2011 race was cancelled due to financial issues. In 2012, Steinmetz Diamonds became the official sponsor of the marathon and renamed the marathon.

The 2020 edition of the race was postponed due to the coronavirus pandemic.

Route
The  race begins at 6:15am and ends at the Phakalane Golf Estate several miles northeast of Gaborone. The race moves along the A1 highway towards the city center before turning northwest towards the Steinmetz building. The route then travels south towards the Gaborone Central Business District, passing the SADC headquarters and the Orapa House. The track then moves northward towards the Gaborone Private Hospital before rejoining the A1 highway. The marathon retraces its steps back towards the Phakalane Golf Estate where the marathon ends. Water is provided every .

Fun Run
There is also a  race open for ages 12 and up and a  race open to all. These routes are entirely within the Phakalane Golf Estate.

Categories
The 42.2K race is divided by gender. Each gender race is divided into three categories based on age: open, veterans, and masters. Veterans are runners between 40 and 49 years of age, and Masters are runners older than 50. The 10K marathon is also divided into categories based on age and gender: open, juniors, veterans, and masters. This race is open to anyone older than 12.

Results
The male and female winner of the marathon receives 25,000 Botswana pula (US$3,325 at the time of the 2012 race), second place receives P15,000, third receives P10,000, and fourth receives P5,000. The fastest male and female Botswana citizen will receive P10,000 from BIHL Insurance Company.

The top three runners, Felix Kipkoror, Benjamin Kipro Serem, and Jobo Khatoane, in the 2012 race qualified for the 2012 Olympic Marathon.

References

External links
 Official website
Results of the 2012 Marathon
Route Map
Photo Gallery of the 2012 Race

Marathons in Botswana
Athletics competitions in Botswana
Recurring sporting events established in 2009
April sporting events
2009 establishments in Botswana
Sport in Gaborone